GLW may refer to:
 Corning Inc., an American technology company with stock symbol GLW
 Gale warning
 Gilawala railway station, in Pakistan
 Glasgow Municipal Airport, in Kentucky, United States
 Glavda language
 Green Left Weekly, an Australian socialist newspaper
 Guitar and Lute Workshop, a defunct American instrument maker
 German equivalent water level